Hidden Valley Lake is a reservoir located in Lake County, California, United States. The reservoir is surrounded by the community of Hidden Valley Lake, California.

References

Reservoirs in Lake County, California